Emanuelle Araújo (born July 21, 1976) is a Brazilian actress, singer and songwriter. She became nationally known in 1999 as lead singer of Banda Eva, where she stayed for only two and a half years until 2002. In 2004 she founded the samba-rock band Moinho with Lan Lan and Toni Costa, in which she is currently vocalist.

Early life and career
Araújo began her career at the age of ten doing theater with the Interarte Company, where she remained until 1990 and starred in the plays A Bruxinha que Era Boa, O Gato Malhado e a Andorinha Sinhá, O Rapto das Cebolinhas, Alice no País das Maravilhas, Pare para Decidir - O Musical and Dançar Bahia, the last two in which she traveled to presentations in Argentina, Uruguay, Peru and France.

In 1993, at age 17, she became pregnant and had her daughter, Bruna. In 1994, she entered the biology course of the Federal University of Bahia, but gave up the first year and began to study performing arts in the same place, where she graduated in 1998.

Filmography

Theater

Discography

Studio albums

Singles

References

External links 

 
 

1976 births
Living people
Brazilian women composers
Brazilian television actresses
Brazilian stage actresses
Brazilian film actresses
People from Salvador, Bahia
21st-century Brazilian singers
21st-century Brazilian women singers